Weedeater are an American stoner metal band formed in Wilmington, North Carolina in 1998. The group's most recent album, Goliathan, was released on May 19, 2015.

History

1998–2003: Formation, ... And Justice for Y'all and Sixteen Tons 
The band formed in 1998 and was initially planned to be the side-project of Dave "Dixie" Collins, the band's vocalist and bassist who was occupied with his primary project Buzzoven, however, the band disbanded the same year so he decided to concentrate his efforts on Weedeater and made it his new primary project, recruiting members Dave "Shep" Shepherd on guitar and Keith "Keko" Kirkum on drums.

The band released their debut album titled ... And Justice for Y'all in 2001 and their second, Sixteen Tons, in 2003, both albums were released via their first record label Berserker Records.

2004–2011: God Luck and Good Speed, Jason... The Dragon, and injuries 

After the release of Sixteen Tons in 2003, the band decided to leave Berserker Records and joined American metal record label Southern Lord Records and released their third album God Luck and Good Speed. In 2009 a deluxe double LP version on the album was also released. The band was also announced as a support act for the American heavy metal supergroup Down. The band was later announced as one of the acts to play at 2010's Hellfest among the likes of Arch Enemy, Architects and Gwar.

The band entered the studio for their fourth album with producer Steve Albini in early January 2010 who also produced their last album God Luck and Good Speed, and also Arik Roper designed the album cover as he did for the band's previous albums. Not long after they entered the studio, Dave "Dixie" Collins accidentally shot himself in the foot, blasting off one of his big toes, whilst he was cleaning his favorite shotgun and was reported to be bedridden for the next few weeks during his recovery. This ultimately led to the band postponing their recording session with Steve Albini until after their tour in March and April.

Despite the setback caused by the accident, the band announced that their next album will be titled Jason...The Dragon and was set for a release later that year, they also announced that their March/April tour will now be called the "Nine Toe" tour in reference to Collins losing his big toe in the accident. The band headlined again in September 2010 after a few other injuries to the band members were reported, in which Keko had torn his meniscus after returning from their previous headlining tour and Dave Shepherd had also broken his pinkie finger while supporting Black Cobra in Europe in July, however, did not prevent the group from returning to Albini to record the album, unlike the previous two accidents.

The album was finally released on March 15, 2011, after all the setbacks caused by the band's injuries throughout 2010. The band went on tour in the US to support the release of the album however had to cancel the last few shows due to Dave Shepherd breaking his hand which prevented him from playing guitar.

2011–present: Record deal, new drummers, and Goliathan 

In November 2013 it was announced by French record label Season of Mist had officially listed Weedeater as part of their roster, and the label re-released all of the band's previous albums digitally in December. The band also announced that they will hopefully be entering the studio soon with either Steve Albini or Billy Anderson. Travis Owen joined the band as drummer and they recorded 2015's Goliathan album with Steve Albini at his studio in Chicago. Owen left the band in 2017 due to health issues and was replaced by Carlos Denogean. However, Denogean died on August 24, 2018, after only one year in the band. The current Weedeater drummer, at least for the 2019 scheduled tour dates, is Ramzi Ateya, formerly of Betrayer, CWIC, Notch, and Buzzoven. Ramzi grew up with Dixie and Shep and was bandmates with Dixie in Buzzoven for the recording of the At a Loss album and subsequent tour.

Musical style 
Based on reviews from their previous albums the band has often been labelled as stoner, doom and sludge metal as well as being dubbed "weed metal" due to their lyrical style and also referring to Dave Collins' previous band of similar musical style Buzzov•en, also labelled as a stoner and sludge metal band which may have influenced this band's sound.

Band members 
Current
Dave "Dixie" Collins – vocals, bass (1998–present)
Dave "Shep" Shepherd – guitar (1998–present)

Former
Keith "Keko" Kirkum – drums (1998–2013)
Carlos Denogean – drums (2017–2018; his death)
Travis Owen – drums (2013–2017, 2018–2019)

Touring
Ramzi Ateyeh – drums (2019–present)

Timeline

Discography 
Studio albums

References

External links 

American sludge metal musical groups
American stoner rock musical groups
Musical groups established in 1997
Heavy metal musical groups from North Carolina
Southern Lord Records artists
American musical trios
Season of Mist artists